The 2006 Winter Olympics were held in Turin, Italy, from 10 February to 26 February 2006. Approximately 2,508 athletes from 80 National Olympic Committees (NOCs) participated in these Games. Overall, 84 events in 15 disciplines were contested; 45 events were opened to men, 37 to women and 2 were mixed pairs events. Two disciplines were open only to men: Nordic combined and ski jumping, while figure skating was the only one in which men and women competed together in teams. 
Eight new events were introduced: snowboard cross, team pursuit (speed skating), team sprint (cross-country skiing), and the mass-start race (biathlon). The team sprint events replaced the classical men's 30 kilometers (km) and women's 15 km cross-country distances, held at the previous Winter Games in 2002. In total, there were six more events than in the 2002 Winter Olympics in Salt Lake City, United States.

A total of 451 individual athletes won medals. Germany won the highest number of gold medals (11) and led in overall medals (29) for the third consecutive Games. Athletes from 26 NOCs won at least one medal; of these, 18 won at least one gold medal. Latvia (Mārtiņš Rubenis – luge, men's singles)  and Slovakia (Radoslav Židek – snowboarding, men's snowboard cross) won the first medals in their Winter Olympic history. Korean short-track speed skater Ahn Hyun-Soo was the most successful athlete, winning three gold medals and a bronze medal. His compatriot Jin Sun-Yu and Germany's Michael Greis also won three gold medals in short-track speed skating and biathlon respectively.
Canadian speed skater Cindy Klassen won five medals (one gold, two silver, two bronze) and became the eighth Winter Olympian to win five medals at one edition of the Games. German Claudia Pechstein won two medals and became the fourth Winter Olympian to win at least one medal at five editions of the Games. Canadian Duff Gibson won a gold medal in the men's skeleton and, at age 39, became the oldest athlete to win a gold medal in an individual event at the Winter Olympics.

Several records for career medals in a sport were tied or surpassed, including alpine skiing (Norwegian Kjetil André Aamodt won a gold medal to extend his career record to eight medals), biathlon (Germany's Uschi Disl won a bronze, further extending her lead in this sport with nine medals; Norwegian Ole Einar Bjørndalen's three medals raised his career medal tally to nine), freestyle skiing (Norwegian Kari Traa won a silver for a career total of three medals), Nordic combined (Austrian Felix Gottwald won three medals, and tied the record with a career total of six), short track speed skating (American Apolo Anton Ohno and Chinese athletes Yang Yang (A) and Li Jiajun have all won five medals in total), and speed skating (Claudia Pechstein won two medals to extend her career record to nine medals).

{| id="toc" class="toc" summary="Contents"
|align="center" colspan=3|Contents
|-
|
Alpine skiing
Biathlon
Bobsleigh
Cross-country skiing
Curling
|valign=top|
Figure skating
Freestyle skiing
Ice hockey
Luge
Nordic combined
|valign=top|
Short track speed skating
Skeleton
Ski jumping
Snowboarding
Speed skating
|-
|align=center colspan=3| Medal winner changes       Statistics       References
|}


Alpine skiing

Biathlon

Bobsleigh

Cross-country skiing

Curling

Figure skating

Freestyle skiing

Ice hockey

Luge

Nordic combined

Short track speed skating

Skeleton

Ski jumping

Snowboarding

Speed skating

Medal winner changes
A. Russian biathlete Olga Pyleva was the only 2006 Winter Olympics medalist to be stripped of their medal. She won a silver medal in the 15 km race, but tested positive for carphedon and was thus stripped of her medal. Germany's Martina Glagow was given the silver medal and fellow Russian Albina Akhatova won the bronze.

Statistics

Medal leaders

Athletes who won at least two gold medals or three total medals are listed below.

See also
2006 Winter Olympics medal table
List of 2006 Winter Paralympics medal winners

References

External links

 IOC's 2006 Winter Olympic page

Medal winners
Lists of Winter Olympic medalists by year
Italy sport-related lists